Ernst Heinrich Adolf von Pfuel (3 November 1779 – 3 December 1866) was a Prussian general, as well as Prussian Minister of War and later Prime Minister of Prussia.

Pfuel was born in Jahnsfelde, Prussia (present-day  Müncheberg, Germany). He served as commander of Cologne and the Prussian sector of Paris from 1814-15 during the Napoleonic Wars. Pfuel later served as governor of Berlin and governor of the Prussian Canton of Neuchâtel.

Pfuel replaced Karl Wilhelm von Willisen as the Royal Special Commissioner of King Frederick William IV of Prussia during the 1848 revolution. He was a member of the Prussian National Assembly of 1848 and later that year served as Prussian Minister of War from 7 September to 2 November, as well as Prime Minister of Prussia.

Pfuel was a close friend of Heinrich von Kleist. He was also an innovator of the breaststroke swimming technique, and the founder of the world's first military swimming-school, in 1810 in Prague.  From 1816 he was a member of the Gesetzlose Gesellschaft zu Berlin.  He died in Berlin.

References

1779 births
1866 deaths
People from Märkisch-Oderland
People of the Revolutions of 1848
People from the Margraviate of Brandenburg
Prime Ministers of Prussia
Generals of Infantry (Prussia)
Member of the Prussian National Assembly
Prussian nobility
Prussian commanders of the Napoleonic Wars
Swimming in Germany
Recipients of the Pour le Mérite (military class)
Military personnel from Brandenburg